Antiguraleus tepidus is a species of sea snail, a marine gastropod mollusk in the family Mangeliidae.

Description

Distribution
This marine species is endemic to Australia and occurs off New South Wales

References

 Laseron, C. 1954. Revision of the New South Wales Turridae (Mollusca). Australian Zoological Handbook. Sydney : Royal Zoological Society of New South Wales 1-56, pls 1-12.

External links
  Tucker, J.K. 2004 Catalog of recent and fossil turrids (Mollusca: Gastropoda). Zootaxa 682:1-1295.
 Atlas of Living Australia: Antiguraleus tepidus

tepidus
Gastropods described in 1954
Gastropods of Australia